CSIEA-Ottawa stands for the Canadian Society of Iranian Engineers and Architects-Ottawa. As a volunteer base organization, CSIEA has been founded by a group of interested individuals in 2004 in Ottawa, Ontario, Canada. The Society has a non-religious, non-political agenda, and is registered in Ontario.

So far CSIEA has had four annual general meetings (October 2004, May 2005, May 2006, and May 2007).

Since its early days, CSIEA-Ottawa has maintained close relationship with Mohandes  which is a similar organizations, with similar agenda, serving Toronto, Ontario, Canada.

CSIEA organizes different events to facilitate its members' networking, and to promote knowledge, technology and science. It has also been involved in some community work, such as holding information session on cancer awareness for Persian speaking community in Ottawa, in collaboration with the Canadian Cancer Society.

The pre-CSIEA era 

The need for a professional association for Iranian engineers and architects was felt over the years, as many engineers and architects with Iranian background or ties with Iranian culture chose Ottawa as their permanent residence. This movement started in the 1980s and was intensified in the 1990s as Ottawa blossomed with private companies, universities and government institutions.

Before the inception of the CSIEA, Iranian engineers and architects met in different ways, mostly during private parties. Other events were organized by different groups, such as a slideshow on Bam and Kerman's architectural oeuvres in July 2002 and a group visit of the Canadian Museum of Science and Technology in November 2003.

A common characteristic of these pre-CSIEA events was that they were organized and managed by a relatively small number of people (in some instances only one person) and as a result, they lacked the generality in purpose and the continuity that a real association should demonstrate. Another weakness was the relatively small target audience of these events, which were mostly limited to friends and acquaintances.

With these shortfalls in mind, different groups of people were talking about the possibility of organizing these individual efforts into a more systematic form. In summer of 2004 some of these networking pioneers finally got together and undertook a full-fledged feasibility study on the eventual establishment of a society for Iranian engineers and architects in Ottawa. One of the greatest assets of this founding group was the great diversity of its members' background, in terms of age, expertise, and number of years spent in Canada. Although it seemed at the beginning that it might be quite a challenge to build consensus among such a varied group, CSIEA has so far clearly demonstrated that this diversity enriched the group by providing complementary skills, and viewpoints.

Few Milestones 

So far, CSIEA has organized several seasonal events; annual general meetings; workshops; talks; and a number of outdoor events, helping many people to extend their networks of friends and colleagues.

Below is a table of CSIEA's major events:

See also 
 Iranian Canadians

References 

Engineering societies based in Canada
Organizations established in 2004